The Oil & Gas Journal is a leading petroleum industry weekly publication with a worldwide coverage. It is headquartered in Tulsa, Oklahoma and the journal has a major presence in Houston, Texas.  The journal is published by Endeavor Business Media.  Its publisher is Paul Westervelt, and editor is Bob Tippee.  The first issue was published in 1902.  Its online information services started in 1994.

LexisNexis database describes the Oil & Gas Journal as an authoritative source on the petroleum industry  aimed at engineers, oil management and executives throughout the oil and gas industry.  The weekly publishes news, analysis, statistics, and technology updates on exploration, drilling, production, pipeline, transportation, refining, processing and marketing.  It is a subscription trade publication.  Oil & Gas Journal has about 20,000 subscribers for the printed issue and 80,000 for digital subscriptions.

The Oil & Gas Journal began in 1902 as the Oil Investor's Journal of Beaumont, Texas, which covered the oil boom that followed the nearby Spindletop discovery. As the oil discoveries spread along the Gulf Coast, the magazine relocated to Houston. In 1910 the magazine was purchased by Patrick C. Boyle, long-time publisher of the Oil City Derrick in Pennsylvania. Boyle moved the publication briefly to St. Louis, Missouri, then to Tulsa, where it still resides.

In 2018, owner PennWell was acquired by Clarion Events, a British company owned by Blackstone.  In 2019, Clarion sold several PennWell divisions, including Oil & Gas, to Endeavor Business Media.

See also

 Foster Natural Gas/Oil Report
 Plattsprovides energy and metals information and benchmark price assessments in the physical energy markets
 Upstream

References

External links

Magazines established in 1902
Magazines published in Oklahoma
Magazines published in St. Louis
Magazines published in Texas
Mass media in Tulsa, Oklahoma
Petroleum industry
Petroleum magazines
Weekly magazines published in the United States